Jardel Capistrano (born 10 October 1989), commonly known as Jardel, is a Brazilian footballer who is a member of Songkhla  of the Thai League 3.

Club career
Jardel joined Vietnamese side Than Quảng Ninh in January 2017. He was released along with fellow Brazilian Ramon in April of the same year.

Career statistics

Club

Notes

References

1988 births
Living people
Brazilian footballers
Brazilian expatriate footballers
Association football defenders
Rio Branco Esporte Clube players
Grêmio Esportivo Juventus players
Marília Atlético Clube players
União São João Esporte Clube players
Sociedade Esportiva Matonense players
Botafogo Futebol Clube (SP) players
Associação Desportiva Cabofriense players
Clube Atlético Bragantino players
Than Quang Ninh FC players
Campeonato Brasileiro Série B players
V.League 1 players
Brazilian expatriate sportspeople in Vietnam
Expatriate footballers in Vietnam